Enfield  is a rural locality  in Victoria, Australia.

Enfield Post Office was renamed from Whim Holes Post office on 19 November 1874.  It closed on 31 December 1971.

References

Towns in Victoria (Australia)
Golden Plains Shire